Donald E. Kirkland is a retired United States Air Force lieutenant general who last served as the commander of the Air Force Sustainment Center. Previously, he was the director of logistics of the United States Air Force and executive officer to the Chief of Staff of the Air Force.

Kirkland retired in August 2021, handing command of the Air Force Sustainment Center to Tom D. Miller.

Effective dates of promotions

References

Central Michigan University alumni
Living people
National Defense University alumni
Naval War College alumni
Place of birth missing (living people)
Recipients of the Air Force Distinguished Service Medal
Recipients of the Legion of Merit
United States Air Force generals
University of Florida alumni
Year of birth missing (living people)